The 1932 Cuba earthquake refers to a destructive earthquake that struck the city of Santiago de Cuba on February 3, 1932 at around 2:40 am local time.

Events 
The earthquake had a magnitude of 6.6 and an estimated intensity of VIII on the EMS-98 scale. The earthquake resulted in significant damage to the city, with initial reports indicating that around one-third of the buildings in the city were completely ruined, and 80% of the buildings were damaged, including the cathedral and other important structures. 15 people were reported dead, with around 300-400 injured. The neighborhood of Santiago was known to be one of the most active earthquake centers in the West Indies.

References

Earthquakes in Cuba
1932 earthquakes
1932 disasters